The British government used concentration camps during the 1952–1960 Mau Mau Uprising in British Kenya. Thomas Askwith, the official tasked with designing the British 'detention and rehabilitation' programme during the summer and autumn of 1953, termed his system the Pipeline. The British did not initially conceive of rehabilitating Mau Mau suspects through brute force and other ill-treatment—Askwith's final plan, submitted to Baring in October 1953, was intended as "a complete blueprint for winning the war against Mau Mau using socioeconomic and civic reform." What developed, however, has been described as a British gulag.

Two types of work camps were set up. The first type were based in Kikuyu districts with the stated purpose of achieving the Swynnerton Plan; the second were punitive camps, designed for the 30,000 Mau Mau suspects who were deemed unfit to return to the reserves. These forced-labour camps provided a much needed source of labour to continue the colony's infrastructure development.

Colonial officers also saw the second sort of works camps as a way of ensuring that any confession was legitimate and as a final opportunity to extract intelligence. Probably the worst works camp to have been sent to was the one run out of Embakasi Prison, for Embakasi was responsible for the Embakasi Airport, the construction of which was demanded to be finished before the Emergency came to an end. The airport was a massive project with an unquenchable thirst for labour, and the time pressures ensured the detainees' forced labour was especially hard.

The following list includes detention camps of various types, organized by district or province.

The Museum of British Colonialism is also documenting the camps for exhibitions and awareness.

Fort Hall District

Fort Hall Reception Centre
Kamaguta
Kandara
Kangema
Kigumo
Mariira

Embu District

Dondueni
Gathigiriri
Kandongu
Karaba
Mwea
Thiba

Meru District

Mbeû
Miathene
Machakû

Nyeri District

Aguthi
Karatina
Mukuruweini
Mweru
Othaya
Nyeri Show Ground

Kiambu District

Gatundu
Githiga
Kiambu Transit Camp
Ngenya
Waithaka

Rift Valley Province

Marigat

Coast Province

Hola
Mkobe
Takwa

Southern Province

Athi River
Kathonzweni
Mara River
Ngulot

Miscellaneous

Lodwar
Kamiti
Mageta Island
Manyani
Nairobi Dispersal Centre
Saiyusi Island
South Yatta
Fort Hall Prison
Embu Prison
Meru Detention Camp
Kisumu Prison
Marsabit Prison
Nairobi New Prison
Kamiti 'Y' Camp
Hindi
Mombasa Prison
Wamumu

See also
Mau Mau Uprising

References

Mau Mau Uprising
Internment camps of the British Empire
Mau Mau uprising